"Wrong Side of Heaven" is a single by American heavy metal band Five Finger Death Punch from their fourth studio album, The Wrong Side of Heaven and the Righteous Side of Hell, Volume 1. It is the third single from the album, and is the nineteenth single overall from the band, which was released on August 11, 2014.

Background 
To add to the contributions made by the band through their numerous military concerts, the ensemble wanted to create a music video in order to assist vagrant veterans of the armed forces by publicly portraying the consequences of post-traumatic stress disorder on wounded warriors.  Additionally, the group created a "No One Gets Left Behind" jersey to be funded via an Indiegogo crowd funding campaign to assist the organizations mentioned in the video. They also requested that the family and friends of deceased military veterans provide dog tags to assist in the preparation of a memorial wall to accompany the band in late 2014.  It is proposed that the wall eventually will be placed in a museum to honor those who served.

Music video 
The video, directed by Nick Peterson, increases visibility on the suffering of vagrant veterans of the armed forces and the consequences of post-traumatic stress disorder.

Track listing

Charts

Weekly charts

Year-end charts

Certifications

References 

Five Finger Death Punch songs
2014 singles
2013 songs
Song recordings produced by Kevin Churko
Heavy metal ballads
Works about wars
Songs about the military
Songs written by Kevin Churko
Songs written by Zoltan Bathory
Songs written by Ivan Moody (vocalist)
Songs written by Jason Hook
Songs written by Jeremy Spencer (drummer)
Songs about homelessness